Sangarius is an Australian genus of shield bug in the family Acanthosomatidae. The type species is Sangarius paradoxus Stål, 1866. It feeds on Hakea shrubs.

References
 

Acanthosomatidae
Taxa named by Carl Stål
Pentatomomorpha genera